Raphitoma curta is a species of sea snail, a marine gastropod mollusk in the family Raphitomidae.

This species is a nomen dubium.

Description

Distribution
This species occurs in the Mediterranean Sea.

References

 Fenaux A. (1942). Mollusques nouveaux du littoral occidental de la Méditerranée. Bulletin de l'Institut Océanographique 825-826-827: 2-3

External links
 

curta
Gastropods described in 1942